Andhur Sahadevan (15 October 1951 – 27 March 2022) was an Indian guest lecturer, journalist, film critic, and jury member with over 33 years of experience in print and visual media.

Biography 
Sahadevan hailed from the Palakkad District and lived in Karuvassery in the Kozhikode District. He and his wife Pushpa had a daughter.

He died at a private hospital on 27 March 2022.

Career
Sahadevan started his career as a journalist in Mathrubhumi in 1982 and joined Indiavision in 2003 as a Program Consultant. He was a Faculty of Press Academy and served as a professor at the Manorama School of Communication (MASCOM).

He was the host of 24 Frames, a review of foreign art films on the Indiavision Channel, and World War II on the Safari TV Channel. Sahadevan also served as a jury member in the International Documentary category at the 2016 Indian International Film Festival.

He also worked as consulting editor at SouthLive.in.

Jury member
A three-member jury, comprising Kulikar Sotho, Sahadevan, and Dalton L presided over the 'International Documentaries' category, at the All Lights India International Film Festival  in 2016.

Works
 Kanathaya Kathakal (short story collection)

Awards 
 Pampan Madhavan Award 2006
 Kerala State Television Award 2010 
 Television Chamber Award

References

External links
Andur Sahadevan's blog

1951 births
2022 deaths
Indian male journalists
Indian film critics
Journalists from Kerala
People from Palakkad district
People from Kozhikode district